Acipenseriformes  is an order of basal ray-finned fishes that includes living and fossil sturgeons and paddlefishes (Acipenseroidei), as well as the extinct families Chondrosteidae and Peipiaosteidae. They are the second earliest diverging group of living ray-finned fish after the bichirs. Despite being early diverging, they are highly derived, having only weakly ossified skeletons that are mostly made of cartilage, and in modern representatives highly modified skulls.

Description 
The axial skeleton of Acipenseriformes is only partially ossified, with the majority of the bones being replaced with cartilage. The notochord, usually only found in fish embryos, is unconstricted and retained throughout life. The premaxilla and maxilla bones of the skull present in other vertebrates have been lost. While larvae and early juvenile Acipenseriformes have teeth, the adults are toothless, or nearly so. The infraorbital nerve is carried by a series of separate canals, rather than being within the circumorbital bones. The palatoquadrate bones of the skull possess a cartilaginous symphysis (joint), and also have a broad autopalatine plate, as well as a narrow palatoquadrate bridge, and a quadrate flange. The quadratojugal bone is three-pointed (triradiate), and the dentition on the gill-arch is confined to the upper part of the first arch and to only the first and second hypobranchials. Members of Acipenseriformes retain the ability to sense electric fields (electroreception) using structures called ampullae. This ability was present in the last common ancestor of all living jawed fish, but was lost in the ancestor of neopterygian fish. All Acipenseriformes probably possessed barbels like modern sturgeon (which have four) and paddlefish (which have two).

Evolutionary history 
Acipenseriformes are assumed to have evolved from a "palaeonisciform" ancestor. Their closest relatives within the paleonisciformes are uncertain and contested. Eochondrosteus from the Early Triassic of China has been suggested by some authors to be the oldest acipenseriform. The oldest unambiguous members of the order are the Chondrosteidae, a group of large fish found in  marine deposits from the Early Jurassic of Europe, which already have reduced ossification of the skeleton. The Peipiaosteidae are known from Middle Jurassic-Early Cretaceous freshwater deposits in Asia. The oldest known paddlefish is Protopsephurus from the Early Cretaceous of China, while the earliest known sturgeons appear in the Late Cretaceous in North America and Asia.

Classification 
 Order Acipenseriformes Berg, 1940
 Genus †Eochondrosteus? Lu, Li & Yang, 2005
 Family †Chondrosteidae Egerton, 1858
 Genus †Chondrosteus Agassiz, 1833–1844
 Genus †Gyrosteus Agassiz, 1833–1844
 Genus †Strongylosteus Agassiz, 1833–1844
 Family †Peipiaosteidae Liu & Zhou, 1965
 Genus †Spherosteus Jakovlev, 1968
 Genus †Yanosteus Jin et al., 1995
 Genus †Liaosteus Lu, 1995
 Genus †Peipiaosteus Liu & Zhou, 1965 
 Genus †Stichopterus Reis, 1909
Suborder Acipenseroidei Grande & Bemis, 1991
 Family Polyodontidae Bonaparte, 1838 (Paddlefish)
 Genus †Protopsephurus Lu, 1994
 Genus †Paleopsephurus MacAlpin, 1941a
 Subfamily Polyodontinae Grande & Bemis, 1991 non Pflugfelder, 1934
 Genus †Crossopholis Cope, 1883
 Genus Polyodon Lacépède, 1797 (American paddlefish)
 Genus †Psephurus Günther, 1873 (Chinese paddlefish)
 Family Acipenseridae Bonaparte, 1831 sensu Bemis et al., 1997 (Sturgeons)
 Genus †Protoscaphirhynchus Wilimovsky, 1956
 Genus † Engdahlichthys Murray et al. 2020
 Genus †Anchiacipenser Sato, Murray, Vernygora and Currie, 2019
 Genus †Priscosturion Grande & Hilton, 2009 [Psammorhynchus Grande & Hilton, 2006]
 Genus Acipenser Linnaeus, 1758
 Genus Huso J. F. Brandt & Ratzeburg, 1833
 Genus Scaphirhynchus Heckel, 1835
 Genus Pseudoscaphirhynchus Nikolskii, 1900

Conservation
Most living species of Acipenseriformes are classified as threatened (mostly endangered or critically endangered) by the International Union for Conservation of Nature.

The Chinese paddlefish was last seen alive in 2003, and was considered to have gone extinct sometime between 2005 and 2010 by the Yangtze River Fisheries Research Institute in their 2019 report.

Hybridization 
A study published in 2020 reported a successful hybridization between a Russian sturgeon (Acipenser gueldenstaedtii) and an American paddlefish (Polyodon spathula), indicating that the two species can breed with one another despite their lineages having been separated for hundreds of millions of years. This has marked the first successful hybridization between members of Acipenseridae and Polyodontidae.

References 

 Martin Hochleithner and Joern Gessner, The Sturgeons and Paddlefishes of the World: Biology and Aquaculture
 Martin Hochleithner, Joern Gessner, and Sergej Podushka, The Bibliography of Acipenseriformes

External links
Photos and illustrations of Acipenseriformes
CITES finalizes 2006 caviar export quotas

 
Ray-finned fish orders
Taxa named by Lev Berg
Articles which contain graphical timelines
Extant Late Jurassic first appearances